Juliana de Souza Nogueira (born 4 August 1988) is a Brazilian female volleyball player. 
She is part of the Brazil women's national volleyball team.
She competed at the 2011 FIVB World Grand Prix.

She played for Missouri State University, and University of South Florida.

Clubs 

  Finasa/Osasco (2006–2007)
  Zeiler Köniz (2007–2008)
  Uniara Araraquara (2008–2009)
  Mackenzie Esporte Clube (2009–2010)
  Rio de Janeiro (2010–2012)
  Vôlei Amil-Campinas (2012–2014)
  Minas Tênis Clube (2014–2015)
  Rio do Sul (2015–2016)
  Esporte Clube Pinheiros (2016–2017)
  Vôlei Valinhos (2017–2018)
  Balneário Camboriú (2018–2019)

References

External links 

 FIVB profile
 CEV profile
 

1988 births
Living people
Brazilian women's volleyball players
Place of birth missing (living people)
Expatriate volleyball players in Switzerland
Expatriate volleyball players in the United States
Brazilian expatriate sportspeople in the United States
Brazilian expatriate sportspeople in Switzerland
Missouri State Bears and Lady Bears athletes
South Florida Bulls athletes
Universiade gold medalists for Brazil
Universiade medalists in volleyball
Medalists at the 2011 Summer Universiade